Colus turgidulus is a species of sea snail, a marine gastropod mollusk in the family Colidae, the true whelks and the like.

Description

Distribution
This marine species occurs off Ireland.

References

External links
 Friele H. (1877). Preliminary report on the Mollusca from the Norwegian North Atlantic Expedition in 1876. Nyt Magazin for Naturvidenskaberne, 23: 1-10, 1 pl.
 Gofas, S.; Le Renard, J.; Bouchet, P. (2001). Mollusca. in: Costello, M.J. et al. (eds), European Register of Marine Species: a check-list of the marine species in Europe and a bibliography of guides to their identification. Patrimoines Naturels. 50: 180-213

Colidae
Gastropods described in 1877